Lastovo is a village and a municipality in southern Croatia. It is the largest settlement on the eponymous island in Dubrovnik-Neretva County and D119 state road passes through it. According to the 2021 census, the municipality has 748 inhabitants, with 309 living in the village of Lastovo itself.

Gallery

References

Populated places in Dubrovnik-Neretva County
Lastovo